Shockwave Supernova is the fifteenth studio album by guitarist Joe Satriani, released on July 24, 2015 through Sony Music Entertainment. It features bassist Bryan Beller and drummer Marco Minnemann of The Aristocrats, as well as progressive rock multi-instrumentalist Mike Keneally.

Critical reception

Stephen Thomas Erlewine at AllMusic calls Shockwave Supernova "proud egghead music that grooves on its own technical acumen" and that it "feels like a collaborative record; it's as fun to hear [Satriani] play with his band as it is to hear him soar on his own."

Jedd Beaudoin at PopMatters gave the album eight stars out of ten, describing it as "one of Satch's most memorable adventures" and "a record that will please the casual listener as much as the musical scholar". Praise was also given to the "crazy good" rhythm section of Minnemann and Beller, with Beaudoin saying that he hopes for Satriani to release a live album featuring the two musicians.

Track listing
All tracks are written by Joe Satriani.

Personnel
Joe Satriani – guitar, keyboard, bass (track 6), harmonica, production, arrangement, additional recording
Mike Keneally – keyboard, additional rhythm guitar (track 2)
Marco Minnemann – drums (tracks 1, 2, 5–7, 9, 10, 13–15)
Vinnie Colaiuta - drums (tracks 3, 4, 8, 11)
Bryan Beller – bass (tracks 1, 2, 5, 7, 10, 12, 14, 15)
Chris Chaney – bass (tracks 3, 4, 8, 11)
Bobby Vega – bass (track 9)
Tony Menjivar – percussion (track 9), congas, bongos
John Cuniberti – percussion (tracks 1–3, 5, 6, 14), producing, recording, mixing, mastering
Mike Fraser - additional recording, co-producing
Robert Gatley - Skywalker assistant
Judy Kirschner - Skywalker assistant
Dann Michael Thompson - Skywalker assistant
Scott Bergstrom - 25th Street Recording assistant

Charts

References

Joe Satriani albums
2015 albums
Sony Music albums